Benjamin O'Fallan Raborg (1871-1918) was an American artist.

Raborg was born in Sulphur Springs, Missouri in 1871. His parents were Franklin Raborg and Sophia Cooper Raborg Simpson. His uncle was artist Astley David Middleton Cooper.

Career
As an artist, Raborg painted Western themes, including landscapes and portraits. American Indians were common subjects in his paintings.

Later life and legacy

He died in San Francisco, California in 1918 after being hit by a cable car. He is buried in Oak Hill Memorial Park in San Jose, California.

Notable collections

Night Scene of Indian Tipi, oil on canvas, 1918; Smithsonian American Art Museum

References

1871 births
1918 deaths
People from Jefferson County, Missouri
Artists from San Francisco
Painters from California
Burials at Oak Hill Memorial Park